Linda Porter (born 1947) is an historian and British novelist.

Early life 
Porter was born in Exeter, Devon in 1947. Her family have long-standing connections to the West Country, but moved to the London area when she was a small child. She was educated at Walthamstow Hall School in Sevenoaks and at the University of York, from which she has a doctorate in History. On completing her postgraduate work, she moved to New York and lectured at Fordham University and the City University of New York.

Career 
Porter moved back to England, and has worked as a journalist and been a senior adviser on international public relations to a major telecommunications company. In 2004 she won the Biographers Club/Daily Mail prize. Her first book, Mary Tudor: The First Queen was published in 2007. It was a biography of Queen Mary I of England presented a view of Mary as a decisive and clear-headed ruler, and a skilled political and diplomatic operator.

In 2010, her second book Katherine the Queen: The Remarkable Life of Katherine Parr was published. This biography of Katherine Parr detailed her life as a queen and stepmother.

Her third book, Crown of Thistles: The Fatal Inheritance of Mary Queen of Scots, was published by Macmillan in 2013. It tells the story of a divided family and how Scotland and England because one nation.

In 2014 Dr. Porter continued to do public speaking and published articles and book reviews as well as doing research for a fourth book.

Porter's fourth book, Royal Renegades: The Children of Charles I and the English Civil Wars follows the lives of Charles I’s family.

The author’s fifth book, Mistresses: Sex and Scandal at the Court of Charles II, was published in the UK on 16 April 2020.

Personal life 
Porter is married and has one daughter. She lives in Kent.

Published works
 Mary Tudor: The First Queen (2007) 
 The First Queen of England: The Myth of "Bloody Mary" (2008) 
 Katherine the Queen: The Remarkable Life of Katherine Parr" (2010) 
 Katherine the Queen: The Remarkable Life of Katherine Parr, the Last Wife of Henry VIII" (2010) 
 Crown of Thistles: The Fatal Inheritance of Mary Queen of Scots" (2013) 
 Tudors Versus Stewarts: The Fatal Inheritance of Mary Queen of Scots" (2014) 
 Royal Renegades: The Children of Charles I and the English Civil Wars" (2016) 
 Mistresses: Sex and Scandal at the Court of Charles II" (2020)

Notes

External links
 Linda Porter Home Page

English biographers
1947 births
Living people
Alumni of the University of York
Writers from Exeter
British expatriate academics in the United States
English women non-fiction writers
City College of New York faculty
20th-century English women writers
20th-century English historians
20th-century biographers
21st-century English women writers
People educated at Walthamstow Hall
21st-century biographers
Women biographers